Schinderhansen may refer to:

 Schinderhannes, the notorious German highwayman
 Schinderhansen (card game), German card game named after the highwayman